Katarzyna Sokólska (born 23 August 1993) is a Polish athlete. She competed at the 2021 World Athletics Relays, winning the silver medal in the women's 4 × 100 metres relay event.

References

External links

1993 births
Living people
Polish female sprinters
Place of birth missing (living people)